Kisii Sugar Factory (KSF), is a proposed sugar manufacturer in Kenya.

Location

Overview
In March 2016, Kanoria Group, an Indian industrial conglomerate, and the Governor of Kisii County signed a memorandum of understanding (MoU), whereby Kanoria would build a sugar processing factory, capable of crushing 5,000 metric tonnes of cane per day and produce 172,500 metric tonnes of sugar annually. According to the MoU, a thermal power station capable of generating  will be incorporated in the complex. In addition, the complex would produce 15 million litres of ethanol every year. The company will lease land from the county for the purpose of setting up a sugar plantation. More cane will be purchased from out-growers who will be assisted with the right sugar varieties to plant. An expected 1,000 direct jobs and 2,500 indirect jobs will be created by this project.

Ownership
The factory, expected to start construction in July 2016, is a 100% subsidiary of the Kanoria Group, an Indian conglomerate, with business interests in sugar manufacturing, cement, pharmaceuticals, tea, jute products, textiles, chemicals, packaging and roofing materials. The Group whose factories are located on the Indian sub-continent, also owns a sugar factory in Ethiopia.

See also
List of sugar manufacturers in Kenya

References

External links
Kisii steps up Narok, Migori supremacy battle with plan for Sh1bn sugar factory
Kisii signs investment deals worth Sh21 billion
Kenya: Kisii Nets Billions as Investors Pledge to Set Shop in Region

Kisii County
Sugar companies of Kenya
Food and drink companies established in 2016